Hajdú, formerly known as Hajdúság, was an administrative county (comitatus) of the Kingdom of Hungary. The capital of the county was Debrecen. The territory of the county is now part of the Hungarian county Hajdú-Bihar.

Geography
Hajdú county shared borders with the counties Heves, Borsod, Szabolcs, Bihar, Békés and Jász-Nagykun-Szolnok. The river Tisza touched its western border. The Hortobágy National Park steppe lies in the county. Its area was 3343 km² around 1910.

History
The Hajdúság region had a special status in the Kingdom of Hungary, but was turned into the proper county Hajdú in the 19th century. At the 1950 county reform, it was merged with Bihar County (the Hungarian part of pre-Trianon Bihar County) and some smaller parts of the former Szabolcs County to form Hajdú-Bihar County, with its capital at Debrecen.

Demographics

Subdivisions

In the early 20th century, the subdivisions of Hajdú county were:

Notes

References

States and territories disestablished in 1950
Counties in the Kingdom of Hungary